Chaz Ebert (born Charlie Hammel; October 15, 1952) is an American attorney and businesswoman.

Early life and education
Ebert was born in Chicago to Johnnie Hobbs Hammel and Wiley Hammel Sr. She attended Crane Technical High School in Chicago. She earned a Bachelor of Arts from the University of Dubuque, a Master of Arts from University of Wisconsin–Platteville, and a Juris Doctor from the DePaul University College of Law.

Career
Chaz was an executive producer and guest on Ebert Presents: At the Movies. She is the CEO and publisher of Ebert Digital, which publishes RogerEbert.com, which contains an archive of her deceased husband Roger Ebert's film reviews and publishes contributors' film reviews. She was featured in the 2014 documentary Life Itself about Roger Ebert and was an executive producer of the 2019 film Selah and the Spades.

In 2005, Ebert was part of a group of high-profile minority and female shareholders who filed a federal lawsuit against other investors in the bankrupt Rosemont, Illinois-based Emerald Casino. Ebert and the other investors said they lost more than $21 million after the Illinois Gaming Board revoked the license from the Emerald Casino, reportedly because the other investors were accused of lying to state regulators or having ties to organized crime.

After the death of her husband, Ebert became the host of Ebertfest, an annual film festival held in Champaign, Illinois, in collaboration with the UIUC College of Media.

Personal life
Chaz was married to film critic Roger Ebert from 1992 until his death in 2013. She has two children from previous relationships.

Filmography

References

External links
 
 
 Appearances on WGN radio

1952 births
21st-century American businesswomen
21st-century American businesspeople
African-American business executives
African-American publishers (people)
African-American women in business
Businesspeople from Chicago
DePaul University College of Law alumni
Lawyers from Chicago
Living people
University of Dubuque alumni
University of Wisconsin–Platteville alumni
Roger Ebert
Siskel and Ebert